Xestia isolata is a moth of the family Noctuidae. It is endemic to Borneo.

External links
 Species info

Xestia
Moths of Asia